Clyde Beatty (June 10, 1903 – July 19, 1965) was a famed animal trainer, zoo owner, and circus mogul. He joined Howe's Great London Circus in 1921 as a cage boy and spent the next four decades rising to fame as one of the most famous circus performers and animal trainers in the world.  Through his career, the circus impresario owned several circuses, including his own Clyde Beatty Circus from 1945 to 1956.

Biography

Clyde Raymond Beatty was born on June 10, 1903, in Bainbridge, Ross County, Ohio, the eldest of nine children. He graduated from nearby Chillicothe High School, but had already succumbed to the world of the circus. 

On August 16, 1921, at dawn, he and Howard Smith clambered into a boxcar on the DT&I Railroad, bound for Washington Court House, Ohio, and joined Howe's Great London and Van Amburgh's Wild Animal Circus. His first and certainly influential boss was the legendary wild animal trainer Louis Roth. Next, he came under the tutelage of another great trainer, John "Chubby" Guilfoyle. By 1923 Clyde was working small mixed groups of big cats to start 42 uninterrupted seasons in the steel arena.

Beatty became famous for his "fighting act", in which he entered a cage with wild animals with a whip and a pistol strapped to his side. The act was designed to showcase his courage and mastery of wild beasts.  Through his career Beatty trained hippos, polar bears, brown bears, lions, tigers, cougars, and hyenas; sometimes, many brought together all at once in a single cage in a potentially lethal combination. At the height of his fame, the act featured as many as 43 lions and tigers of both sexes, for which Beatty still holds a world record.   and Beatty had his own rail car in the 35-car circus train.

Young Clyde's self-confidence and unabashed theatrics swiftly catapulted him to circus fame. Within a decade, the name Clyde Beatty became synonymous with the best and most exciting wild animal training ever seen under the Big Top.  There have been suggestions that Beatty was the first lion tamer to use a chair in his act, but in an autobiographical book he disclaimed credit for this technique: "It was in use when I was a cage boy and had been used long before."

Beatty's fame was such that he appeared in films from the 1930s to the 1950s and on television until the 1960s. He was also the star of his own syndicated radio series, The Clyde Beatty Show, from 1950 to 1952. The weekly programs featured adventures loosely based on his real-life exploits. The stories were no doubt more fictitious than real, and Beatty actually appeared in name only; Vic Perrin (not identified as such to the radio audience) impersonated him on the show.

Beatty's "fighting act" made him the paradigm of a lion tamer for more than a generation. He was once mauled by a lion named Nero and was in the hospital for ten weeks as a result of the attack. However, he remained undaunted and faced down Nero in a cage for the 1933 film The Big Cage.

At the height of Beatty's fame, a caricature of Clyde, drawn by Alex Gard, was displayed at Sardi's restaurant in New York City and is now part of the Billy Rose Theatre Collection at the New York Public Library.

In 1957, Beatty performed his act on The Ed Sullivan Show. He had complained during rehearsal that the stage was too small and unsafe for his act, but Sullivan convinced him to perform anyway. During the act, Beatty lost control of the animals. To prevent the home audience from realizing the live performance had gone awry, Sullivan went into the audience to introduce some of the celebrity attendees. Luckily, Beatty was able to subdue the lions by firing blank cartridges, without injury to himself or the lions. A clip of the performance is included in a DVD of the best of the Sullivan show.

Beatty married Harriett Evans (her name is often printed as "Harriet"), an aerialist, on September 16, 1933. The marriage lasted until her death in 1950 in Kosciusko, Mississippi, reportedly from a heart ailment. Their union seems to have been founded on a great deal of team spirit, and after a year or so she insisted on becoming an animal trainer herself, which was highly unusual for a woman in those days. Beatty let her have an act in 1935 and she did well, proving to be popular with the public and the press. Her daughter Albina (born 1931), having learned animal training skills from her stepfather and mother, followed in their footsteps as a lion trainer. She stated that Beatty's gift to her was understanding his instincts regarding the animals and how best to control them.

Beatty died of cancer in 1965, at age 63, in Ventura, California, and was interred in the Forest Lawn–Hollywood Hills Cemetery in Los Angeles.

A museum has been opened in Clyde's hometown of Bainbridge, Ohio celebrating the life and times of the circus mogul. Illinois State University has a 1960 route book for the Cole-Beatty circus posted online.

Marriages 

 Beatrice Ernestine Pegg - Married January 26, 1926.  Divorced November 1st, 1932.  1 Child: Joyce Beatty Ferguson
 Harriett Evans - Married September 13, 1933.  Harriett died on October 15, 1950 from a heart condition.  1 step child: Albina Diana Davila 
 Jane Lorraine Abel  - Married July 31, 1951.  Clyde died on July 19, 1965 from esophageal cancer.  1 Child: Clyde Beatty Jr.

Circus career 

 1921 Howe's Great London, joined 16 August, Washington Court House, Ohio 
 1922 Gollmar Bros (same show as above) until on 1 November when Beatty was picked up by the Hagenbeck-Wallace train on the way to Peru, Indiana along with hippo Victor to appear on the corporation's winter show 1923 John Robinson's-for the most part the 
 1922 Gollmar show-frequently billed as "100th Anniversary" 
 1924 John Robinson's 
 1925-1934 Hagenbeck-Wallace (sometimes Carl Hagenbeck-Wallace) 
 1931-1934 Played dates at Madison Square Garden & Boston Garden with Ringling Bros and Barnum & Bailey, then back to Hagenbeck-Wallace each year for road tours 
 1935-1938 Cole Bros (sometimes Cole Bros-Clyde Beatty; Cole closed early on 15 August 1938) 
 1938 Robbins Bros Beatty (same owners as Cole), Beatty joined 15 August for remainder of season 
 1939 Million Dollar Pier, Atlantic City 
 1940 Hamid-Morton- This show while under tents was the leased Wallace Bros Circus repainted. Sometimes Hamid-Morton featuring Clyde Beatty, sometimes Hamid-Morton Clyde Beatty Combined (the titles were also used on some indoor dates) 
 1941-1942 Johnny J. Jones Shows (railroad carnival) 1943 Clyde-Beatty-Wallace Bros (actually the Wallace Bros show), Beatty paid for act and use of his name 
 1944 Clyde Beatty-Russell Bros (actually the Russell Bros show), Beatty paid for act and use of his name 
 1945 Clyde Beatty Circus, sometimes Clyde Beatty All New Trained Wild Animal Circus (motorized-the former Wallace Bros, Beatty owned) 
 1946 Clyde Beatty Circus (the former Russell Bros-Pan Pacific Circus on rails), Art Concello, principal owner, Beatty bought him out post-1946 season 
 1947-1956 Clyde Beatty Circus (on rails 1955-mid 1955, Concello becomes part owner) 
 1956 Clyde Beatty Circus closes early 9 May Burbank, California, to winter quarters in Deming, New Mexico; show reorganized under new owners, reopened 30 August, Deming 
 1957-1958 Clyde Beatty Circus, new owners, on trucks 
 1959-1965 Clyde Beatty-Cole Bros Circus, on trucks 
 1964 Beatty out for cancer treatment 18 July until 30 October 
 1965 Beatty leaves show 10 May, never returns 
 Various Dates: Beatty also appeared at many spots and dates for George Hamid, Orrin Davenport, and others in Shrine, Grotto, etc. shows which are too numerous to list.

Bibliography 

1933 The Big Cage (co-author Edward Anthony)
1941 Jungle Performers (co-author Earl Wilson)
1965 Facing The Big Cats: My World of Lions and Tigers (co-author Edward Anthony)

Filmography

Cultural references 

 In the 1997 film Fast, Cheap & Out of Control, the lion tamer Dave Hoover cites Beatty as a major influence on his career. The director, Errol Morris, used several clips from Beatty's films in his interviews with Hoover.
 In the 1981 television pilot of The Greatest American Hero, Ralph Hinkley is told by a fellow teacher that the "Clyde Beatty technique" is one way to use a chair to keep his unruly students "at bay".
 In the 1961 adventure film Hatari! John Wayne's character refers to the use of a chair in controlling a cheetah as a "Clyde Beatty routine"

See also

 Tiger versus lion

References

Sources 
 Ohmart, Ben (2002). It's That Time Again. Albany: BearManor Media. .

External links

The Clyde Beatty Exhibit

Clyde Beatty Show - OTR - Old Time Radio (11 episodes)

Clyde Beatty and Cole Bros. Circus records, 1959, held by the Billy Rose Theatre Division, New York Public Library for the Performing Arts
 A Pictorial History of the Clyde Beatty Cole Bros. Circus

1903 births
1965 deaths
20th-century American male actors
American circus performers
American male film actors
Animal trainers
Burials at Forest Lawn Memorial Park (Hollywood Hills)
Circus owners
Deaths from cancer in California
Elephant trainers
Lion tamers
Male actors from Ohio
People from Bainbridge, Ross County, Ohio